Seyyed Mohammad Hosseini (born 4 July 1969) is a US-resident Iranian showman, political activist, radio host, and founder and current leader of an Iranian opposition group called "Restart."

Career
Seyed Mohammad Hosseini was born in Iran and joined the Islamic Republic of Iran Broadcasting (IRIB) service in 1994 as a TV program host. During his years at the IRIB, Hosseini was active as a producer, director, and hosted a number of game shows until 2010 when he left IRIB. In 2011, Hosseini immigrated to the United States as a political refugee and became a vocal advocate against the Islamic Republic of Iran.

In the US, he has started an opposition group called "Restart" which is currently active against the Islamic Republic. Since the inception of his opposition group, Hosseini has attempted to attract young Iranians to his group with the ultimate goal of regime change. Hosseini encourages his followers to attack the Islamic Revolutionary Guard Corps and Basij bases and government buildings throughout the country as part of his plan to cause the collapse of the government. The Restart movement led by Hosseini claims to have some 20 million international followers and describes itself as the largest opposition group against the Islamic Republic of Iran.

Footnotes

External links 
 Official Website

1969 births
Living people
Political refugees in the United States
Iranian emigrants to the United States
Iranian political satire
Iranian dissidents
Iranian television personalities
Iranian television presenters
Iranian television producers
People from Tehran
Iranian radio and television presenters